The Catholic Church in Indian Ocean island states of Sri Lanka and Maldives is solely composed of
 one Latin ecclesiastical province, comprising a Metropolitan archdiocese and twelve suffragan dioceses, all in Sri Lanka, which jointly constitute the (bi)national Episcopal Conference of Sri Lanka. The Maldives have no actual jurisdiction, but are the responsibility of the Archdiocese of Colombo.

There are no Eastern Catholic, pre-diocesan or other exempt jurisdictions.

All defunct jurisdictions are formerly Ceylonese precursors of present Sri Lankan sees.

There is an Apostolic Nuncio to Sri Lanka resident in the national capital Colombo as papal diplomatic representation at level of an ambassador, and no representation of the Holy See in the Maldives.

Latin dioceses in Sri Lanka and Maldives 
Ecclesiastical Province of Colombo 
 Metropolitan Archdiocese of Colombo, which has the entire territory of the Maldives within its jurisdiction 
Diocese of Anuradhapura
Diocese of Badulla
Diocese of Batticaloa
Diocese of Chilaw
Diocese of Galle
Diocese of Jaffna
Diocese of Kandy
Diocese of Kurunegala
Diocese of Mannar
Diocese of Ratnapura 
Diocese of Trincomalee

See also 
 List of Catholic dioceses (structured view)
 Catholic Church in the Maldives
 Catholic Church in Sri Lanka

Sources and external links 
 GCatholic.org - data for all sections.
 Catholic-Hierarchy entry.

Sri Lanka
Catholic Church in the Maldives
Catholic dioceses
Catholic dioceses